Government Boys High School Kanniakulangara (popularly known as  BHS Kanniakulangara(Kanyakulangara)) is one among the oldest Schools in Kanyakulangara, Vembayam Panchayat, Thiruvananthapuram (Trivandrum) Established by Govt. of Kerala. The school is affiliated to the Kerala State Board of Education and is one of the oldest schools in Kerala.

Overview
Kanniakulangara, just 100 meters away from Vembayam Jn. . . Govt. BHS, has total area of 5 acres land consisting full of trees and shades that you never forget once visited there. The school is owned by the Govt. of Kerala has a unique position among public sector schools globally. This is one of the largest schools, which has the highest number of boy's students in Trivandrum rural.

Extra-curricular activities 
The school has the following active clubs convened by respective departments: Natural club, Quiz club,  English club, Sanskrit club, Energy club, IT Club, NCC, Sports, Forestry club, Health club, Social Science Club, Teenage club.

Notable alumni
 Sankar (V R Sankar), Film director, Screen writer and Novelist

References

High schools and secondary schools in Kerala
Boys' schools in India
Schools in Thiruvananthapuram district